Floyd Elgin Dominy (December 24, 1909 Adams County, Nebraska – April 20, 2010 Boyce, Virginia) was appointed commissioner of the United States Bureau of Reclamation from May 1, 1959, to December 1, 1969, by Dwight D. Eisenhower. Dominy joined the Bureau in 1946. He was the assistant commissioner from 1957 to 1958. He was responsible for building Glen Canyon Dam and the creation of Lake Powell behind it. He died in Boyce, Virginia, where he had lived since at least 1990.

Dominy was a strong advocate for use of the Colorado River and other water resources of the west for agriculture and development, in opposition to the growing environmental movement. He was the director of several projects like the Colorado River Storage Project, Colorado River Basin Project, Missouri River Basin Project, Columbia River Basin Project, California Central Valley Project, and the Mekong River Basin Project in Thailand. 

Dominy was a main character in two non-fiction books about water management the American west: Cadillac Desert by Marc Reisner and Encounters with the Archdruid by John McPhee. McPhee arranged a whitewater rafting trip down the Colorado River with Dominy and David Brower, a prominent environmentalist and founder of Friends of the Earth, and the book highlights their opposing views of the river and its uses.

References 
 Floyd Dominy's Obituary in The Washington Post
 Floyd Dominy, the colossus of dams, dies at 100
 Reisner, Marc (1993). Cadillac Desert: The American West and Its Disappearing Water (paperback). Penguin Books. .
 McPhee, John (1971). Encounters with the Archdruid (hardcover). Farrar, Straus and Giroux. .
 Interview with High Country News. Retrieved November 2, 2005
 High Country News article. Retrieved November 2, 2005 
 BuRec Bio
 "Floyd E. Dominy". Life. February 27, 1963. (image "US Reclamation Bureau official Floyd Dominy (R) inspecting the Arghandab River Dam.") 
 A History of the Emery County Project website that contains a picture of Dominy and other dignitaries getting ready to set off a blast at the Joes Valley Dam groundbreaking ceremony in 1963

Specific

External links 
 Floyd E. Dominy Papers at the University of Wyoming - American Heritage Center
 Select Digital Collection of the Floyd E. Dominy Papers at the AHC Digital Archive

1909 births
2010 deaths
People from Adams County, Nebraska
American centenarians
Men centenarians
University of Wyoming alumni
United States Bureau of Reclamation personnel
People from Boyce, Virginia